Stephanie Joanne White (formerly Stephanie White-McCarty; born June 20, 1977) is a former professional basketball player and head coach of the Connecticut Sun of the WNBA. She was previously head coach of the Vanderbilt Commodores women's basketball team from 2016 to 2021. Prior to Vanderbilt, she was the head coach of the Indiana Fever of the WNBA for the 2015 and 2016 season. As an intercollegiate athlete, she was named the winner of the Wade Trophy in 1999, which recognizes the top female basketball player in the nation.

White was the 1995 Indiana Miss Basketball and was also named 1995 Gatorade National Player of the Year and the USA Today National Player of the Year. White attended Seeger High School in West Lebanon, Indiana, where she  was named a High School All-American by the WBCA. She participated in the WBCA  High School All-America Game in 1995, scoring seventeen points, and earning MVP honors. She led Purdue University to the 1999 NCAA Women's National Championship in basketball. She played five years in the WNBA, one with the Charlotte Sting and four with the Indiana Fever. She retired in 2004.

White joined the Chicago Sky as an assistant coach in 2007, spending four seasons there until she joined her college coach, Lin Dunn, as the first former WNBA player to serve as an assistant coach on the Fever staff. She was named head coach on September 23, 2014, making her the youngest active coach in the league.

College 
White attended Purdue University, where she was named National College Player of the Year, Indiana NCAA Woman of the Year, and Big Ten Conference Player of the Year on the way to leading Purdue to the NCAA National Championship in 1999.

Purdue statistics
Source

USA Basketball
White competed with USA Basketball as a member of the 1997 Jones Cup Team that won the silver medal in Taipei. Several of the games were close, with the USA team winning four games by six points or fewer, including an overtime game in the semifinal match against Japan. The gold medal game against South Korea was also close, but the USA fell 76–71 to claim the silver medal for the event. White was the second leading scorer for the team, averaging 10.3 points per game.

Awards and honors

 1999—Wade Trophy
 1999—Winner of the Honda Sports Award for basketball

Professional

White began her five-year WNBA career with the Charlotte Sting in 1999 under her married name, Stephanie White-McCarty. She was acquired a year later in an expansion draft by the Indiana Fever to lead the team's inaugural season roster. After four years with the Fever, she ranked third in games played (112) and three point field goals (92), and fourth in scoring (684). She averaged 5.9 points and 2.0 assists per game.

She retired from the WNBA in 2004, and went on to become the assistant coach at Ball State (2003–04), Kansas State (2004–05), and the University of Toledo (2005–06 and 2006–07), before going to the Chicago Sky. White was involved in all aspects of the basketball program, including recruiting, on-floor coaching, scouting, individual workouts and academic support.

Since 2007, White has also served as a college basketball analyst for ESPN and the Big Ten Network, including studio work and co-hosting the network's coverage of the Big Ten Women's Basketball Tournament.

Coaching
After a four-year stint as an assistant, White took over the head coaching duties for the Indiana Fever following Lin Dunn's retirement.  In her first season, she led the Fever to their second WNBA Finals appearance, losing the best-of-five series to Minnesota.  Indiana went 20–14 overall in White's debut season. In her second season with the Fever, White finished the season with a 17–17 record and lost in the first round of the playoffs to the Phoenix Mercury.

On May 23, 2016, White accepted the head coaching job for the Vanderbilt Commodores women's basketball team.  She completed the 2016 season with the Fever finishing her time there with a 37–31 overall record and a 6–6 record in the postseason.

Through her first two seasons at Vanderbilt, White compiled a 21–40 overall record and went 7–25 against Southeastern Conference competition.

Her fifth season at Vanderbilt was shortened in January 2021, due to COVID-19 concerns, injuries, and a depleted roster. It would eventually be her final season with Vanderbilt, as the school parted ways with White on April 6, 2021.

Head coaching record

College

WNBA

|-
| align="left" |IND
| align="left" |2015
| 34|| 20|| 14||.588|| align="center" |3rd in East ||11||6||5||.545
| align="center" | Lost in WNBA Finals
|-
| align="left" |IND
| align="left" |2016
| 34|| 17|| 17|| .500|| align="center" | 3rd in East||1||0||1||.000
| align="center" | Lost in First Round
|-class="sortbottom"
| align="left" |Career
| ||68||37||31||.544|| ||12||6||6||.500||

Personal life
She married Brent McCarty in 1998. They divorced in 2002.

White resides in Nashville, Tennessee, with her three young children.

References

1977 births
Living people
All-American college women's basketball players
American women's basketball coaches
American women's basketball players
Ball State Cardinals women's basketball coaches
Basketball coaches from Indiana
Basketball players from Indiana
Charlotte Sting players
Connecticut Sun coaches
Chicago Sky coaches
Indiana Fever coaches
Indiana Fever players
Kansas State Wildcats women's basketball coaches
LGBT basketball players
Parade High School All-Americans (girls' basketball)
People from Warren County, Indiana
Purdue Boilermakers women's basketball players
Shooting guards
Toledo Rockets women's basketball coaches
Vanderbilt Commodores women's basketball coaches
Big Ten Athlete of the Year winners